Dubrava or Dúbrava may refer to several places:

Bosnia and Herzegovina
 Dubrava, Kalinovik, a village

Croatia
 Dubrava, Zagreb, a neighbourhood of Zagreb
 Dubrava, Zagreb County, a village and municipality
 Lake Dubrava
 Dubrava, Dubrovnik-Neretva County
 Dubrava, Split-Dalmatia County, a village near Omiš
 Dubrava Zabočka

Montenegro
 Dubrava, Pljevlja

Serbia
 Dubrava, Bojnik
 Dubrava, Ivanjica
 Dubrava (Knić)
 Dubrava, Kuršumlija

Slovakia
 Dúbrava, Liptovský Mikuláš District
 Dúbrava, Levoča District
 Dúbrava, Snina District
 Hronská Dúbrava

See also
 
 Dúbrava (disambiguation), a Slovak toponym
 Doubrava (disambiguation), a Czech term
 Dumbrava (disambiguation), a Romanian term
 Dubrave (disambiguation), South Slavic plural term
 Dabrava (disambiguation), a Bulgarian toponym
 Dąbrowa (disambiguation), a Polish term
 Dubravica (disambiguation), South Slavic diminutive term

Slavic toponyms